Bjoern Seibert is a German politician who is the current Head of Cabinet for Ursula von der Leyen, President of the European Commission. He's worked with von der Leyen since she was Defence Minister of Germany.

Seibert coordinated the EU's sanctions during the Russian invasion of Ukraine with the United States, with his role being described as "key" by a European diplomat.

Early life 
Seibert studied political science in the United States.

Career 
He served for six years on the Policy Planning and Advisory Staff of the German Defence Minister under von der Leyen.

European Commission 
In 2020, Seibert and von der Leyen were criticized for creating a large backlog of high-level and senior position vacancies at the Commission due to their insistence on having personal control over the appointments. Over 70 director, director general or deputy director general jobs were unfilled as well as over 80 mid-level positions. Over 21% of senior positions across departments were vacant in mid-October according to Politico. He has been criticized for his role as leader of von der Leyen's advisers due to them not taking much input from people outside this inner circle, including from her commissioners.

After Russia invaded Ukraine in 2022, Seibert was "critical" to the successful European negotiations with the United States regarding international sanctions on Russia. According to an EU diplomat cited by the Financial Times, he was "the only one [that had] an overview on the EU and in constant contact with the US".

References 

Year of birth missing (living people)
Living people
Place of birth missing (living people)
Date of birth missing (living people)
Von der Leyen Commission
People of the Russo-Ukrainian War
21st-century German politicians